The Lu Xun Literary Prize (or Lu Xun Literature Prize)  鲁迅文学奖 is a literary prize awarded by China Writers Association. It is one of China's top four literary prizes and is named after Lu Xun and has been awarded every three years since 1995. Its predecessor, the National Outstanding Short Story Award and National Outstanding Novella Award, was established since the beginning of the new-era literature in the early 1980s.

The 2010 Lu Xun literature prize 5th Award Ceremony was held in Shaoxing on October 19, 2010. Che Yangao, secretary of the discipline inspection committee in Hubei's capital city of Wuhan, won the award for his collection of poems "Yearning for Warmth."

The Prize has seven award categories:
 National Excellent Novella Award
 National Excellent Short Story Award
 National Excellent Reportage Award
 National Outstanding Poetry Award
 National Excellent Prose Essay Prize
 National Outstanding Literary Review Awards
 National Outstanding Literary Translation Award (formerly the Rainbow Translation Award)

1st Awards (1995-1996)
The following translated titles are approximate.
National Excellent Short Story Award, 1995—1996
史铁生: 《老屋小记》 Shi Tiesheng: Memory of the old house
迟子建: 《雾月牛栏》 Chi Zijian:  Cowpen in the foggy moon
阿 成: 《赵一曼女士》 Ah Cheng: Ms Zhao Yiman
陈世旭: 《镇长之死》 Chen Shixu: Death of the mayor 
毕飞宇: 《哺乳期的女人》 Bi Feiyu: Lactating women
池 莉: 《心比身先老》 Chi Li: The heart ages before the body
National Excellent Novella Award, 1995—1996
邓一光: 《父亲是个兵》 Deng Yiguang: Father is a soldier
林 希: 《小的儿》 Lin Xi (writer): Small boy
刘醒龙: 《挑担茶叶上北京》 Liu Xinglong: Heading for Beijing, with a basket of tea leaves
何 申: 《年前年后》 He Shen (writer): Years before, years after 
李国文: 《涅槃》 Li Guowen: Nirvana
刘 恒: 《天知地知》 Liu Heng: Heaven knows, Earth knows
东 西: 《没有语言的生活》 Dong Xi (writer): Life without Language
阎连科: 《黄金洞》 Yan Lianke: Gold Cave
李贯通: 《天缺一角》 Li Guantong: Missing a corner of sky
徐小斌: 《双鱼星座》 Xu Xiaobin: Pisces
National Excellent Reportage Award, 1995—1996
邢军纪、 曹 岩: 《锦州之恋》 Xing Junji and Cao Yan: Jinzhou Love
杨黎光: 《灵魂何归》（亦名：《没有家园的灵魂》）Yang Liguang: Restless Soul
冷 梦: 《黄河大移民》 Leng Meng: Yellow River Immigrants
一 合: 《黑脸》 Yi He (writer): Black Face
金 辉: 《恸问苍冥》 Jin Hui: 
江宛柳: 《没有掌声的征途》 Jiang Wanliu: Journey without Applause
郭晓晔: 《东方大审判》 Guo Xiaoye: Eastern Trial
张建伟: 《温故戊戌年》 Zhang Jianwei:
陈桂棣: 《淮河的警告》 Chen Guidi: Huai River warning
徐 剑：《大国长剑》 Xu Jian (writer): Long Sword of a Great Kingdom
王家达: 《敦煌之恋》 Wang Jiada: Dunhuang Love
何建明: 《共和国告急》 He Jianming: Republic Emergency
李鸣生: 《走出地球村》 Li Mingsheng: Walking out of the global village
程童一 等: 《开埠》 Cheng Tongyi and others: Open Port
董葆存: 《毛泽东和蒙哥马利》 Dong Baocun: Mao Zedong and Montgomery
National Excellent Poetry Award, 1995—1996
李 瑛: 《生命是一片叶子》 Li Ying (writer): Life is a Leaf
匡 满: 《今天没有空难》 Kuang Man: Today there is no air crash
韩作荣: 《韩作荣自选集》 Han Zuorong: Han Zuorong's selection of poetry
沈 苇: 《在瞬间逗留》 Shen Wei: Lingering in the moment
张新泉: 《鸟落民间》 Zhang Xinquan: Bird landing among the people
王久辛: 《狂雪》 Wang Jiuxin: Crazy Snow
辛 茹: 《寻觅光荣》 Xin Ru: Seeking Glory
李松涛: 《拒绝末日》 Li Songtao: Resisting Doomsday
National Excellent Essay Award, 1995—1996
冰 心: 《我的家在哪里》 Bing Xin: Where is my home?
季羡林: 《赋得永久的悔》 Ji Xianlin: Permanent regret
严 秀: 《牵牛花蔓》 Yan Xiu: 
雷 加: 《半月随笔二集》 Lei Jia (writer): Half-moon jottings, 2 collections
郭 风: 《郭风散文选集》 Guo Feng: Selected Essays of Guo Feng
艾 煊: 《烟水江南绿》 Ai Xuan (writer): Smoke and water, Jiangnan green
National Outstanding Prose Award, 1995—1996
何 为: 《何为散文选集》 He Wei: Collected Essays of He Wei
王充闾: 《春宽梦窄》 Wang Chonglu: Spring is wide, dream is narrow
周 涛: 《中华散文珍藏本•周涛卷》 Zhou Tao (writer): Chinese prose collection: Zhou Tao vol.
铁 凝: 《女人的白夜》 Tie Ning: Woman's white night
李 辉: 《秋白茫茫》 Li Hui (writer): Autumn white so vast
周同宾: 《皇天后土》 Zhou Tongbin: 
赵 玫: 《从这里到永恒》 Zhao Mei: From here to eternity
刘成章: 《羊想云彩》 Liu Chengzhang: Sheep Imagining Clouds
夏坚勇: 《湮没的辉煌》 Xia Xianyong: Brilliance annihilated
斯 妤: 《两种生活》 Si Yu: Two Kinds of Life
National Excellent Misc. Writing Award, 1995—1996 
林祖基: 《微言集》 Lin Zuji: Micro-writing
何满子: 《何满子杂文自选集》 He Manzi: Selected Works of He Manzi
邵燕祥: 《邵燕祥随笔》 Shao Yanxiang: Essays
韩 羽: 《韩羽杂文自选集》 Han Yu (writer): Miscellaneous Writings
唐达成: 《世象杂拾》 Tang Dacheng: 
National Excellent Theoretical Review Award, 1995—1996
樊 骏: 《认识老舍》 Fan Jun: Knowing Lao She
敏 泽: 《社会主义市场经济与文学价值论》 Min Ze: On Socialist Market Economy and Literary Value
陈伯海: 《自传统至现代——近四百年中国文学思潮变迁论》 Chen Bohai: From Tradition to Today – on the evolution of trends in Chinese literary thought over the last 400 years
曾镇南: 《论鲁迅与林语堂的幽默观》 Zeng Zhennan: On Lu Xun's and Lin Yutang's views on humour
邵伯周: 《茅盾几部重要作品的评价问题》 Shao Bozhou: Problems in evaluating some of Mao Dun's important works
National Excellent Literary Translation Award, 1995—1996
（jury recommendations）陈占元, 金克木, 黄 源, 刘辽逸, 吕叔湘, 施蛰存, 孙绳武, 伍孟昌, 朱维之, 陈冰夷, 齐 香, 方 平, 金 隄,蒋 路, 磊 然, 李 芒, 钱春绮, 孙家晋, 唐 笙, 辛未艾, 袁可嘉, 叶水夫, 郑永慧, 草 婴, 任溶溶
National Excellent Literary Translation Rainbow Award, 1995—1996
杨德豫 译: 《华兹华斯抒情诗选》Yang Deyu (tr) Anthology of Wordsworth's Lyrics
燕汉生 译: 《艾青诗百首》 Yan Hansheng (tr):  Ai Qing 100 Poems
绿 原 译: 《浮士德》 Lu Yuan (tr): Faust
范维信 译: 《修道院纪事》 Fan Weixin (tr): Abbey Chronicle
顾蕴璞 译: 《莱蒙托夫全集２•抒情诗II》 Gu Yunpu (tr): Complete works of Lemontov 2: Lyrics II

2nd Awards (2000)
The following translated titles are approximate.

National Excellent Short Story Award, 1997－2000
刘庆邦:《鞋》 LIU Qingbang: Shoes
石舒清:《清水里的刀子》 SHI Shuqing: Knife in Fresh Water 
红  柯:《吹牛》 HONG Ke: Bragging 
徐　坤:《厨房》 Xu Kun: Kitchen 
迟子建:《清水洗尘》 CHE Zijian: Washing off Dust in Fresh Water 
National Excellent Novella Award, 1997－2000
叶广芩:《梦也何曾到谢桥》 YE Guangqin: Xie Bridge 
鬼　子:《被雨淋湿的河》 Guizi (writer): Rain-drenched River 
铁　凝:《永远有多远》 TIE Ning: How Far is Forever 
衣向东:《吹满风的山谷》 YI Xiangdong: Wind in the Valley 
阎连科:《年月日》 YAN Lianke: Year Month Day 
National Excellent Reportage Award 1997－2000
何建明:《落泪是金》HE Jianming: Tears are Gold 
王树增:《远东朝鲜战争》WANG Shuzeng: Far East Korean War 
梅　洁:《西部的倾诉》MEI Jie: Westside Discussion 
李鸣生:《中国863》LI Mingsheng: China 863 
杨黎光:《生死一线》WANG Liguang: Line between Life and Death 
National Outstanding Poetry Award 1997－2000
杨晓民:《羞涩》YANG Xiaomin: Shy 
曲有源:《曲有源白话诗选》QU Youyuan: Selection of Vernacular Poems 
朱增泉:《地球是一只泪眼》ZHU Zengquan: The Earth is a Teary Eye 
西　川:《西川的诗》XI Chuan: Poems of Sichuan 
曹宇翔:《纯粹阳光》CAO Yuxuan: Pure Sunshine 
National Excellent Prose Essay Prize 1997－2000
李国文:《大雅村言》LI Guowen: Daya village words 
余秋雨:《山居笔记》YU Qiuyu: Notes on Living in the Mountains 
朱铁志:《精神的归宿》ZHU Tiezhi: Spirit Returned
徐光耀:《昨夜西风凋碧树》YU Guangyao: Last Night's West Wind Battered the Green Tree
张抗抗:《张抗抗散文》ZHANG Kangkang: Essays
National Outstanding Literary Review Award 1997－2000
陈　涌:《"五四"文化革命的再评价》CHEN Yong: Re-evaluation of the May 4th Culture Revolution
程文超:《一九O三：前夜的涌动》CHENG Wenchao: 1903: overnight surge
何向阳:《12个：1998年的孩子》HE Xiangyang: 12 children of 1998
韩子勇:《西部：偏远省份的文学写作》HAN Ziyong: Literary writing of the remote western provinces
钱中文:《文学理论现代性问题》QIAN Zhongwen: Contemporary Questions in Literary Theory
National Outstanding Literary Translation Award 1995－1998
屠　岸　译:《济慈诗选》Tu An (tr) – Anthology of Keats Poetry
董燕生　译:《堂吉诃德》DONG Yansheng (tr) – Don Quixote
王焕生　译:《奥德赛》WANG Huansheng (tr)– The Odyssey
董　纯　译:《秧歌》DONG Chun (tr)– Yangge 
陶　洁　译:《圣殿》TAO Jie (tr) - Temple

3rd Awards (2001-2003)
The following translated titles are approximate.
National Excellent Novella Award, 2001-2003
毕飞宇: 《玉米》 Bi Feiyu: Corn
陈应松: 《松鸦为什么鸣叫》 Chen Yingsong: Why the jay crows
夏天敏: 《好大一对羊》 Xia Tianmin: An enormous pair of sheep
孙惠芬: 《歇马山庄的两个女人》 Sun Huifen: The Two Women of Xiema Village
National Excellent Short Story Award, 2001-2003
王祥夫: 《上边》 Wang Xiangfu: Above
温亚军: 《驮水的日子》 Wen Yajun: Carrying Water Days
魏 微: 《大老郑的女人》 Wei Wei: Big Lao Zheng's Woman
王安忆: 《发廊情话》 Wang Anyi: Confidences in a Hair Salon
National Excellent Reportage Award, 2001-2003
王光明 and 姜良纲: 《中国有座鲁西监狱》 Wang Guangming and Jiang Lianggang: In China there's Luxi Prison
李春雷: 《宝山》 Li Chunlei: Baoshan
杨黎光: 《瘟疫，人类的影子"非典"溯源》 Yang Liguang: Plague, shadow of mankind, tracing back SARS
加央西热（藏）: 《西藏最后的驮队》 Jia-yang-xi-ri (Tibetan): The last pack team in Tibet
赵瑜、胡世全: 《革命百里洲》 Zhao Yu and Hu Shiquan: Revolution Bailizhou
National Excellent Poetry Award, 2001-2003
老乡: 《野诗全集》 Lao xiang: Wild Poems, Complete Works
郁葱: 《郁葱抒情诗》 Yu Cong: Yu Cong poems
马新朝: 《幻河》 Ma Xinchao: Magic River
成幼殊: 《幸存的一粟》 Cheng Youshu: 
娜夜（满、女）: 《娜夜诗选》 Na Ye: Selection of Na Ye's poetry
National Excellent Essay Prose Award, 2001-2003
贾平凹: 《贾平凹长篇散文精选》 Jia Pingwa: The best of Jia Pingwa's long essays
李存葆: 《大河遗梦》 Li Xubao: Dreams on a big river
史铁生: 《病隙碎笔》 Shi Tiesheng: Break in Illness
素素: 《独语东北》 Su Su: Alone, talking of the northeast
鄢烈山: 《一个人的经典》 Yan Lingshan: One person's classic
National Excellent Theoretical Review Award, 2001-2003
吴义勤: 《难度•长度•速度•限度——关于长篇小说文体问题的思考》 Wu Yiqin: Difficulty, Length, Speed, Limitations - reflections on the issue of style in novels
王向峰: 《〈手稿〉的美学解读》 Wang Xiangfeng: Aesthetic interpretation of "manuscript"
陈超: 《打开诗的漂流瓶——现代诗研究论集》 Chen Chao: Letting the poem out of the bottle: research on modern poetry
朱向前: 《朱向前文学理论批评选》 Zhu Xiangqian: Selection of Literary Criticism by Zhu Xiangqian
National Excellent Literary Translation Award, 2001-2003
田德望 译: 《神曲》（但丁•著•意大利文） Tian Dewang (tr): Divine Comedy, by Dante
黄燎宇 译: 《雷曼先生》（斯文•雷根纳•著•德文）Huang Liaoyu (tr): Herr Lehman, by Sven Regena

4th Awards (2004-2006)
The following translated titles are approximate.
National Excellent Novella Award, 2004-2006
 蒋韵: 《心爱的树》 Jiang Yun: Beloved Tree
 田耳: 《一个人张灯结彩》 Tian Er: Title
 葛水平: 《喊山》 Ge Shuiping: Title
 迟子建: 《世界上所有的夜晚》 Chi Zijian: All the nights in the world
 晓航: 《师兄的透镜》 Xiao Hang: Brothers In the Mirror
National Excellent Short Story Award, 2004-2006
 范小青: 《城乡简史》 Fan Xiaoqing: Short history of town and country
 郭文斌: 《吉祥如意》 Guo Wenbin: General's Army
 邵丽: 《明惠的圣诞》 Shao Li: Minghui's Christmas
National Excellent Reportage Award, 2004-2006
 朱晓军: 《天使在作战》 Zhu Xiaojun: Angel in combat
 何建明: 《部长与国家》 He Jianming: Minister and State
 党益民: 《用胸膛行走西藏》 Dang Yimin: Walking in Tibet
 王宏甲: 《中国新教育风暴》 Wang Hongjia: China's new educational storm
 王树增: 《长征》 Wang Shuzeng: Long March
National Excellent Poetry Award, 2004-2006
 田禾: 《喊故乡》 Tian He: Calling home
 荣荣: 《看见》 Rong Rong: See
 黄亚洲: 《行吟长征路》 Huang Yazhou: Long March
 林雪: 《大地葵花》 Lin Xue: World of Sunflowers
 于坚: 《只有大海苍茫如幕》 Yu Jian: Only the sea as vast as the screen
National Excellent Essay Prose Award, 2004-2006
 韩少功: 《山南水北》 Han Shaogong: South of the mountains, north of the river
 南帆: 《辛亥年的枪声》 Nan Fan: Gunfire in the Xinhai Year
 刘家科: 《乡村记忆》 Liu Jiake: Village Memory
 裘山山: 《遥远的天堂》 Qiu Shanshan: Remote Paradise
National Excellent Theoretical Review Award, 2004-2006
 李敬泽: 《见证一千零一夜——21世纪初的文学生活》 Li Jingze: Witness the Thousand and One Nights – Literary life in the 21st century
 陈晓明: 《无边的挑战——中国先锋文学的后现代性》 Chen Xiaoming: Boundless challenge: Postmodernity of Chinese Avant-garde literature
 欧阳友权: 《数字化语境中的文艺学》 Ouyang Youquan: Literature and Art in the digital context
 雷达: 《当前文学创作症候分析》 Lei Da: Analysis of Symptoms of the current literature creation
 洪治纲: 《困顿中的挣扎——贾平凹论》 Hong Zhigang: Struggling in the difficulties – on Jia Pingwa
National Excellent Literary Translation Award, 2004-2006
 许金龙译: 《别了，我的书》（大江健三郎•著•日文） Xu Jinlong (tr): [title], by Kenzaburo Oe
 王东亮译: 《笑忘录》（米兰•昆德拉•著•法文） Wang Dongliang (tr): Book of Laughter and Forgetting, by Milan Kundera
 李之义译: 《斯特林堡文集》（五卷）（斯特林堡•著•瑞典文）Li Zhiyi (tr), The Works of August Strindberg, 5 vols

5th Awards (2007-2009)
2010: Su Tong, Fang Fang, Tsering Norbu

6th Awards (2010-2013)
The following translated titles are approximate.
National Excellent Novella Award, 2010-2013
 格非:	《隐身衣》 Ge Fei: Invisibility Cloak
 滕肖澜: 《美丽的日子》 Teng Xiaolan: Beautiful Day
 吕新:	《白杨木的春天》Lv Xin: Poplar Spring
 胡学文: 《从正午开始的黄昏》 Hu Xuewen: Dusk from Noon
 王跃文: 《漫水》 Wang Yuewen: Spreading Water	
National Excellent Short Story Award, 2010-2013
 马晓丽: 《俄罗斯陆军腰带》 Ma Xiaoli: My Russian Army Belt
 叶舟: 《我的帐篷里有平安》 Ye Zhou: Peace in My Tent
 叶弥: 《香炉山》 Ye Mi: Incense Burner Mountain
 张楚: 《良宵》 Zhang Chu (author): Good Night
 徐则臣: 《如果大雪封门》 Xu Zechen: If Snow Blocks the Door
National Excellent Reportage Award, 2010-2013
 黄传会: 《中国新生代农民工》 Huang Chuanhui: China's New Generation of Migrant Workers
 任林举: 《粮道》Ren Linju: Food Road
 肖亦农: 《毛乌素绿色传奇》 Xiao Yinong: Tales of the Desert
 铁流、徐锦庚: 《中国民办教育调查》 Tie Liu and Xu Jingeng: Survey of Private Education in China
 徐怀中: 《底色》 Xu Huaizhong: Background
National Excellent Poetry Award, 2010-2013
 阎安: 《整理石头》 Yan An (author): Ordering Stones
 大解: 《个人史》 Da Jie: Personal History
 海男: 《忧伤的黑麋鹿》	Hai Nan: Sad Black Elk
 周啸天: 《将进茶——周啸天诗词选》 Zhou Xiaotian: Bring in the Tea - Poetry Selection
 李元胜: 《无限事》 Li Yuansheng: Infinite Things
National Excellent Essay Prose Award, 2010-2013
 刘亮程: 《在新疆》 Liu Liangcheng: In Xinjiang
 贺捷生: 《父亲的雪山 母亲的草地》 He Jiesheng: Father's Snow Mountains, Mother's Grasslands
 穆涛: 《先前的风气》 Mu Tao: Earlier Culture
 周晓枫: 《巨鲸歌唱》 Zhou Xiaofeng: The Huge Whale Song
 侯健飞: 《回鹿山》 Hou Jianfei: Return to Deer Mountain
National Excellent Theoretical Review Award, 2010-2013
 孟繁华: 《文学革命终结之后——新世纪文学论稿》 Meng Fanghua: After the End of Literary Revolution - New Century Literary Theory
 鲁枢元: 《陶渊明的幽灵》 Lu Shuyuan: The Spirit of Tao Yuanming
 程德培: 《谁也管不住说话这张嘴》	Cheng Depei: No one Can Stop This Mouth From Talking
 张新颖: 《中国当代文学中沈从文传统的回响 ——〈活着〉、〈秦腔〉、〈天香〉和这个传统 的不同部分的对话》 Zhang Xinying: The reverberations of Shen Congwen's tradition in Chinese contemporary literature
 贺绍俊	《建设性姿态下的精神重建》 He Shaojun: Spiritual Reconstruction under a Constructive Attitude

National Excellent Literary Translation Award, 2010-2013

 赵振江: 《人民的风》 Zhao Zhenjiang: Wind of the People
 刘方: 《布罗岱克的报告》 Liu Fang (author): Brodyck's Report
 王家湘: 《有色人民——回忆录》 Wang Jiaxiang: Interesting People - Memoirs
 韩瑞祥: 《上海，远在何方？》 Han Ruixiang: Shanghai, how far?

7th Awards (2014-2017) 
National Excellent Novella Award, 2014-2017

 石一枫 :《世间已无陈金芳》 Shi Yifeng
阿来:《蘑菇圈》  Alai
尹学芸:《李海叔叔》Yin Xueyun
小白:《封锁》  Xiao Bai
肖江虹:《傩面》  Xiao Jianghong

National Excellent Short Story Award, 2014-2017

 黄咏梅:《父亲的后视镜》  Huang Yongmei
马金莲:《1987年的浆水和酸菜》 Ma Jinlian
冯骥才:《俗世奇人》Feng Jicai
弋舟: 《出警》  Yi Zhou
朱辉 :《七层宝塔》Zhu Hui

National Excellent Reportage Award, 2014-2017

 李春雷:《朋友：习近平与贾大山交往纪事》Li Chunlei
丰收:《西长城》  Feng Shou
许晨:《第四极：中国"蛟龙"号挑战深海》 Xu Chen
徐刚:《大森林》  Xu Gang
纪红建:《乡村国是》Ji Hongjian

National Excellent Poetry Award, 2014-2017

 汤养宗:《去人间》Tang Yangzong
杜涯:《落日与朝霞》 Du Ya
胡弦:《沙漏》Hu Xian
陈先发:《九章》 Chen Xianfa
张执浩:《高原上的野花》  Zhang Zhihao

National Excellent Essay Prose Award, 2014-2017

 李修文:《山河袈裟》  Li Xiuwen
宁肯:《北京：城与年》Ning Ken
李娟:《遥远的向日葵地》  Li Juan
鲍尔吉·原野:《流水似的走马》Bao'erji Yuanye
夏立君:《时间的压力》  Xia Lijun

National Excellent Theoretical Review Award, 2014-2017

 黄发有:《中国当代文学传媒研究》 Huang Fayou
陈思和:《有关20世纪中国文学史研究的几个问题》 Chen Sihe
刘大先:《必须保卫历史》Liu Daxian
王尧:《重读汪曾祺兼论当代文学相关问题》Wang Yao
白烨:《文坛新观察》 Bai Hua

National Excellent Literary Translation Award, 2014-2017

 Lu Yanping 路燕萍 - translation of Eduardo Galeano's Memoria del Fuego - Genesis《火的记忆I：创世纪》
Yu Zhongxian 余中先 - translation of Christophe Ono-Dit-Biot's Plonger《潜》
Li Yongyi 李永毅 - translation of Horace's Odes《贺拉斯诗全集》 
Wang Jun - translation of Ludovico Ariosto's Orlando Furioso 《疯狂的罗兰》

References

Chinese literary awards
Awards established in 1995
Novella awards
Poetry awards
Short story awards
Translation awards
Chinese-language literary awards
Lu Xun